Mariana Limbǎu (born August 25, 1977) is a Romanian sprint canoer who competed in the late 1990s and early 2000s. She won a bronze medal in the K-4 500 m event at the 2000 Summer Olympics in Sydney.

References

1977 births
Canoeists at the 2000 Summer Olympics
Living people
Olympic canoeists of Romania
Olympic bronze medalists for Romania
Romanian female canoeists
Olympic medalists in canoeing
Medalists at the 2000 Summer Olympics
20th-century Romanian women